Elections in the Regional Municipality of York of Ontario, Canada were held on 25 October 2010 in conjunction with municipal elections across the province. The results below are unofficial, pending review from the respective clerk's office for each municipality. Each elected representative becomes a member of York Regional Council.

York Regional Council

Aurora

East Gwillimbury

Georgina

King
The official results for King were declared on 28 October 2010. Of eligible voters, 49.94% cast a ballot.

Markham

Results 

The following results are unofficial pending any recounts for closes races.

Mayor

Regional councillor

Heath, Jones and Landon were incumbent members of Regional Council. Jones is a former Progressive Conservative MP and Town Councillor. Landon is an incumbent member and longtime Regional Councillor. Horchik was incumbent Ward 6 Town Councillor.
Heath was former Ward 5 Town Councillor.

Joseph Virgilio, who was appointed to council to replace the late Tony C. Wong, did not run in 2010.

Li has previously run for council in 2006. He ran as a Conservative candidate in the federal riding of Markham- Unionville in 2006 and 2004 and as a Progressive Conservative candidate in the federal riding of Scarborough—Rouge River in 1997.

Ward 1 

Burke has been councillor since 2006 and was former executive assistant to York Regional Council.

Ward 2 

Incumbent councillor Erin Shapero decided not to run for re-election.

Ward 3 

Hamilton won the by-election in 2009 to replace Joseph Virgilio, who left to become York Regional Councillor in 2009 following the death of Tony C. Wong.

Ward 4

Ward 5 

Webster is a lifelong resident with family history in Markham and seeking a third term. Webster is also Markham's Town Crier.

Longtime Markham resident Hamilton is acting Chief Officer with the Toronto Fire Services.

Ward 6 

Incumbent Dan Horchik sought a seat as Regional Councillor.

Usman is former Ward 7 councillor 1998-2006 (left to run as Regional Councillor) and ran as a Liberal in the provincial election in 1995. Kwan former candidate for Ward 6 in 2006.

Ward 7 

Kanapathi was first elected in 2006 when former councillor Khalid Usman ran for Regional Council.

Ward 8 

Chiu is longtime Ward 8 councillor and was Ward 7 councillor before the re-division created new wards for Miliken Mills. Chiu has been in elected office since 1986 and is also a retailer at Market Village Mall.

Newmarket

Van Bynen won his second term as mayor and has been in elected office in Newmarket since 2000.

Richmond Hill

Mayor

Regional councillor

Two regional council seats were contested in Richmond Hill.

Cohen is former Ward 3 councillor.

Town Council

The incumbents of four of the six wards were challenged for council seats.

Ward 1 - Wilcox Lake, Bond Lake, Oak Ridges, Quaker

Ward 2 - Newkirk, Leno Park, Town Park

Incumbent councillor Arnie Warner did not run for re-election.

Ward 3 - Helmkay Park, Headford

Incumbent councillor Cohen ran for Regional Council. Gandhi ran in 2006 in Ward 3. Assadourian is a former Liberal MPP. Liu is a broadcaster with Fairchild Radio.

Ward 4 - Jefferson, Elgin Mills

Ward 5 - Yongehurst, Beverley Arces, Richvale

Ward 6 - West Beaver Creek, East Beaver Creek

Vaughan

Whitchurch–Stouffville

References

2010 Ontario municipal elections
Politics of the Regional Municipality of York